Baku railway station is the central station of Baku, the capital of Azerbaijan. It is located in the Nesimi district in central Baku, approximately 3 km northeast from the historical core of Baku, İçərişəhər.

It is connected to the adjacent 28 May metro station by a pedestrian tunnel. It is also the terminal of the circular Baku suburban railway.

History
The first station building dates back to 1880, with the launch of the Baku-Tbilisi railway. The architecture of the first building was in the Moorish Revival style. In 1926, the second station complex, Sabunchu Station, was designed and constructed to serve the electrified Baku–Sabunchu railway. The architecture of the second building is also in the Moorish Revival style. In 1967, the 28 May metro station was built and connected to the Sabunchu Station by a pedestrian tunnel. In 1977, the station underwent a major renovation, during which a modern station building was built, adjacent to the old Sabunchu Station. In 2017, the station underwent a renovation again.

Gallery

See also
 Azerbaijan Railways
 Rail transport in Azerbaijan
 Baku–Tbilisi–Kars railway

References

External links

Buildings and structures in Baku
Railway stations in Azerbaijan
Transport in Baku
Railway stations opened in 1880
Khrisanf Vasilyev buildings and structures